Randy Bates (born July 3, 1960) is an American football coach who is currently the defensive coordinator for the Pittsburgh Panthers.

Coaching career
In 1982, Bates began his coaching career at Division III Muskingum College. From there he spent the 1983 season as a graduate assistant at Miami University. From 1984 to 1988 he served as defensive coordinator and recruiting coordinator for the Saint Joseph's College Pumas. He spent the next three seasons coaching linebackers and defensive backs for the Navy Midshipmen. Bates coached linebackers at New Hampshire from 1992 to 1997.

From 2006 to 2017, Bates spent 12 seasons coaching linebackers for the Northwestern Wildcats and head coach Pat Fitzgerald. Bates' linebacker unit helped the No. 17 Wildcats post a 10-3 record in 2017, which included a win over the Kentucky Wildcats in the Music City Bowl. He coached back-to-back All-America linebackers, in Anthony Walker Jr. and Paddy Fisher.

On January 13, 2018, Bates was hired by the Pittsburgh Panthers and head coach Pat Narduzzi as the defensive coordinator, a position left vacant by Josh Conklin.

References

External links
 Northwestern profile
 Pittsburgh profile

1960 births
Living people
Kent State Golden Flashes football coaches
Louisiana Tech Bulldogs football coaches
Miami RedHawks football coaches
Muskingum Fighting Muskies football coaches
Navy Midshipmen football coaches
New Hampshire Wildcats football coaches
Northwestern Wildcats football coaches
Pittsburgh Panthers football coaches
Saint Joseph's Pumas football coaches
Ohio State University College of Education and Human Ecology alumni